Florenciellales is an order of Dictyochophyceae.

It includes Pseudochattonella, Florenciella, and Luteocerasus.

References

Dictyochophyceae
Heterokont orders